Sud-Nikolayevka is a rural locality (a selo) and the administrative center of Pervomayskoye Rural Settlement, Podgorensky District, Voronezh Oblast, Russia. The population was 719 as of 2010. There are 9 streets.

Geography 
Sud-Nikolayevka is located 10 km south of Podgorensky (the district's administrative centre) by road. Pokrovka is the nearest rural locality.

References 

Rural localities in Podgorensky District